Edmund de Ferrers, 6th Baron Ferrers of Chartley (1386–1435) was the son of Robert de Ferrers, 5th Baron Ferrers of Chartley and Margaret Le Despenser, a daughter of Edward le Despencer, 1st Baron le Despencer.

He inherited the title of Baron Ferrers of Chartley upon his father's death in 1413 but was never summoned to parliament. Edmund fought in most of the great victories of King Henry V including the Battle of Agincourt and married Helen, daughter and co-heir of Thomas de la Roche, by whom he acquired large landed possessions, amongst which was that of Castle Bromwich in the county of Warwickshire.

The couple had two sons, Edmund (to whom his estates were entailed) and William (who became William, 7th Baron Ferrers of Chartley) as well as one daughter, Margaret de Ferrers, who married John Beauchamp, 1st Baron Beauchamp of Powick becoming Lady Beaucamp of Powick.

Edmund de Ferrers, 6th Baron Ferrers of Chartley, died aged 49 in 1435.

See also
Earl of Stafford
Earl of Derby

References
Kidd, Charles, Williamson, David (editors). Debrett's Peerage and Baronetage (1990 edition). New York: St Martin's Press, 1990.

1386 births
1435 deaths
15th-century English people
06
People of the Hundred Years' War